Paraburkholderia elongata is a Gram-negative bacterium belonging to the genus Paraburkholderia. The type strain is P. elongata 5NT, which was isolated from the Arnot research forest, near Van Etten, New York, using agar medium supplemented with soil-extracted, solubilized organic matter. The same isolation effort and methodology led to the isolation of P. solitsugae 1NT. P. elongata was named after its tendency to form elongated, filamentous cells when grown in concentrated growth media. Phosphate concentration was found to regulate the conditional filamentation of P. elongata, resulting from the accumulation of intracellular polyphosphate.

References 

elongata